Giuseppe Asquini (19 August 1901 – 12 January 1987) is an Italian politician who served as Mayor of Pordenone (1945–1946) and Senator (1948–1953).

References

1901 births
1987 deaths
Mayors of Pordenone
Action Party (Italy) politicians
Italian Socialist Party politicians
Italian Democratic Socialist Party politicians
Senators of Legislature I of Italy